Behir Chergui  is a town and commune in Oum El Bouaghi Province, Algeria.

Localities  of the commune 
The commune is composed of 5 localities:

References 

Communes of Oum El Bouaghi Province